Tutto Tony Tammaro (Italian for All Tony Tammaro) is the double CD greatest hits by Neapolitan parody singer-songwriter Tony Tammaro. It was released in 1999 and included all songs composed by the singer during his musical career.

Track listing

Vol.1 
 Patrizia (2:26)
 Il parco dell'amore (2:59)
 Scalea (1:48)
 E va facite appere (3:18)
 Volo di un cazettino (3:28)
 Tiene 'e ccorna (3:18)
 Fidanzati in casa (2:32)
 Foto di gruppo (3:54)
 Al Cafone (1:47)
 Restituiscimi il mio cuore (4:11)
 A casa per le sette (2:07)
 U Strunzu (2:45)
 Quelli con la panza (2:58)
 Miché (1:51)
 La pubblicità (2:20)
 Aerobic Tamar Dance (3:53)
 'O Sacchetto (1:44)
 Ciakkami (3:17)
 Come (2:38)
 U Curnudu (2:43)
 Mio marito (3:11)
 Teorema (2:18)
 Chat line (3:40)
 Chiatta (4:01)

Vol.2
 'O Trerrote (2:23)
 La villeggiatura (3:15)
 Serenata cell (4:20)
 Mio fratello fuma scrock (1:28)
 Se potrei avere te (2:23)
 Il mozzarellista (3:17)
 Bottana (3:16)
 Pronto Marì (2:23)
 Torregaveta (2:34)
 Tango dei tamarri (4:00)
 Dint a villa (2:46)
 Casa Cascella (2:41)
 Alla fiera della casa (2:19)
 Un altra guerra (5:10)
 A cinquecento (2:40)
 L'animale (2:43)
 Si piglio 'o posto (1:56)
 Anni sessanta (5:46)
 Ballerino (3:21)
 Zio Tobia (1:28)
 Samba du gassu (1:44)
 Puzzulan Rap (2:23)
 Karaoke (3:18)
 Il rock dei tamarri (2:00)

Tony Tammaro albums
1999 greatest hits albums